Uwe Daßler (born 11 February 1967), commonly spelled Uwe Dassler in English, is a former middle- and long-distance swimmer from Germany, who represented East Germany (GDR) in international competition.

He was European champion in the 400-metre freestyle in 1985 and 1987.

At the 1988 Summer Olympics in Seoul, South Korea, Dassler won three medals.  He won a gold medal and set a new world record of 3:46.95 in the men's 400-metre freestyle.  He then won a bronze for his third-place finish in the men's 1,500-metre freestyle (15:06.15), behind Soviet Vladimir Salnikov (15:00.40) and West German Stefan Pfeiffer (15:02.69).  He also won a silver medal as a member of the second-place East German team in silver men's 4×200-metre freestyle relay (7:13.60).

See also
 German records in swimming
 Swimming at the 1988 Summer Olympics
 World record progression 400 metres freestyle

External links

 Official Website

1967 births
Living people
People from Ebersbach-Neugersdorf
German male swimmers
Olympic swimmers of East Germany
Swimmers at the 1988 Summer Olympics
Olympic gold medalists for East Germany
Olympic silver medalists for East Germany
Olympic bronze medalists for East Germany
World record setters in swimming
Olympic bronze medalists in swimming
German male freestyle swimmers
World Aquatics Championships medalists in swimming
National People's Army military athletes
European Aquatics Championships medalists in swimming
Medalists at the 1988 Summer Olympics
Olympic silver medalists in swimming
Olympic gold medalists in swimming
Sportspeople from Saxony